Gary Moore (4 November 1945 - 20 November 2021) was an English former footballer who played in The Football League.

Career
Moore, born in Sedgefield, County Durham, gained school representative honours with Sunderland Boys and Durham County Boys, he then signed for Sunderland as an amateur when he was still 15. At 16 he played for the England Youth Team and became a full-time professional at 17. After six seasons at Roker Park, Moore was transferred to Grimsby, where he notched up 15 goals in an 18 months stay. When he arrived at Roots Hall, he was yet another in the long line of North-countrymen to move to Southend in an effort to find fame and fortune with United. He made 164 league appearances with Southend, and had a successful loan spell at Essex rivals Colchester. He later moved on to Chester, where he scored in the Football League Cup semi-final against Aston Villa, and then Swansea before retiring through injury.

References

External links
 
 Gary Moore at Colchester United Archive Database

1945 births
Living people
Association football forwards
English footballers
Sunderland A.F.C. players
Grimsby Town F.C. players
Southend United F.C. players
Colchester United F.C. players
Chester City F.C. players
Swansea City A.F.C. players
English Football League players